The Catalonia International Trophy is an association football friendly tournament organised in Spain by the Catalan Football Federation and which the Catalonia national team plays against another national team. It was created in 2009 and is held annually at the end of December.

History
Since 1997, the Catalan national team has played an international friendly match nearly every year, coinciding with the Christmas holidays. In 2009, in the context of Catalan aspirations to participate in official FIFA or UEFA competitions, the president of the Catalan Football Federation, Jordi Casals, announced the conversion of friendlies into an annual tournament, named the Catalonia International Trophy. The artist Joan Mora donated a sculpture symbolising the four bars of the Catalan flag as a prize for the winner.

On 22 December 2009, the first edition, Johan Cruyff's Catalonia won 4–2 against Diego Maradona's Argentina. After that, four more games were held against Honduras, Tunisia, Nigeria and Cape Verde.

Fixtures and results

Fixtures

Results

Records and statistics

Results summary

Table of winners

Top goalscorers

See also
Centenary Trophy

Notes and references

Notes

References

External links
 

2009 establishments in Catalonia
2009 establishments in Spain
Annual sporting events
Recurring sporting events established in 2009
Catalan football friendly trophies
Spanish football friendly trophies
International association football competitions hosted by Spain
Catalonia national football team